Live in Philadelphia Dec. 1997 is a live album by Atari Teenage Riot. The CD version was distributed with certain pressings of 60 Second Wipeout. The album was recorded at the Beyond Nightclub.

Track listing

CD pressing
"Get Up While You Can" – 5:10 
"Deutschland Has Gotta Die!" – 3:03 
"Sick To Death" – 3:45 
"Destroy 2000 Years Of Culture" – 3:51 
"Not Your Business" – 2:59 
"Speed" – 5:20 
"Into The Death" – 3:24 
"Atari Teenage Riot" – 3:17 
"Midijunkies" – 7:41

12" vinyl pressing
Side A
"Get Up While You Can"
"Deutschland Has Gotta Die!"
"Sick To Death"
"Destroy 2000 Years Of Culture"
"Not Your Business"
Side B
"Speed"
"Into The Death"
"Atari Teenage Riot"
"Midijunkies"

References

CD entry at discogs.com
12" vinyl entry at discogs.com

Atari Teenage Riot albums
1999 live albums
Elektra Records live albums